The Jaipur Literature Festival, or JLF, is an annual literary festival which takes place in the Indian city of Jaipur each year in the month of January. It was founded in 2006. 

The Diggi Palace Hotel serves as the main venue of the festival, with sessions held in the Hall of Audience and throughout the gardens of the Diggi Palace in the city centre.

The festival directors are the writers Namita Gokhale and William Dalrymple and is produced by Sanjoy Roy of Teamwork Arts. The Festival is an Initiative of the Jaipur Virasat Foundation (JVF) founded by Faith Singh, originally as a segment of the Jaipur Heritage International Festival in 2006, and developed into a free-standing festival of literature standing on its own feet in 2008. JVF's Community Director Vinod Joshi is its regional advisor. All events at the festival are free and not ticketed.

In 2012, a number of events occurred related to the Salman Rushdie and the Satanic Verses controversy.

A number of events created by the organisers of JLF, loosely named JLF International, have taken place in other cities around the world.

History, timeline

2006
The 2006 inaugural Jaipur Literature Festival featured 18 writers, including Hari Kunzru, William Dalrymple, Shobhaa De and Namita Gokhale and 14 others. It drew a crowd of about 100 attendees, some of whom "appeared to be tourists who had simply got lost", according to the event's co-director William Dalrymple.

2007
In 2007 the festival grew in size and featured Salman Rushdie, Kiran Desai, Suketu Mehta, Shashi Deshpande, and William Dalrymple.

2008
In 2008 the festival continued to expand with about 2,500 attendees and the following authors/speakers: Ian McEwan, Donna Tartt, John Berendt, Paul Zacharia, Indra Sinha, Uday Prakash, Christopher Hampton, Manil Suri, Miranda Seymour

2009
The 2009 festival had about 12,000 attendees and over 140 authors/speakers including Vikram Seth, Pico Iyer, Michael Ondaatje, Simon Schama, Tina Brown, Hanif Kureshi, Hari Kunzru, Pankaj Mishra, Tariq Ali, Ahmed Rashid, Patrick French, Mohsin Hamid, Mohammed Hanif, Wendy Doniger, Sunil Gangopadhyay, Tarun Tejpal, Sashi Tharoor, U R Ananthmurthy, Alka Saraogi, Anuragh Mathur, Ashok Vajpeyi, Ashis Nandy, Basharat Peer, Charles Nicoll, Christophe Jaffrelot, Colin Thubron, Daniyal Mueenuddin, Geetanjali Shree, Mukul Kesavan, Musharraf Ali Farooqui, G. T. Narayana Rao, Nikita Lalwani, Paul Zacharia, Pavan K Varma, Rana Dasgupta, S R Faruqui, Tash Aw, Udayan Vajpeyi, Farah Khan and Sonia Faleiro, with music provided by DJ Cheb i Sabbah, Nitin Sawney, Salman Ahmad (Junoon Unplugged), Shye Ben Tzur, Rajasthan Roots, Paban Das Baul and others in evening concerts over the five days. The special theme was the oral tradition, in India and elsewhere.

2010
The 2010 festival had about 30,000 attendees and 172 authors/speakers, including Geoff Dyer, Henry Louis Gates Jr., Jamaica Kincaid, Niall Ferguson, Vikram Chandra and Hemant Shesh.

2011

The 2011 festival had 226 writers like Hemant Shesh, Prasoon Joshi, Javed Akhtar, Gulzar /speakers, including Nobel-winners J. M. Coetzee and Orhan Pamuk.

2012

The 2012 festival was held from 20 to 24 January, with the talk-show host Oprah Winfrey and author Salman Rushdie among the names announced in advance. Rushdie later cancelled, and indeed cancelled his complete tour of India, citing possible threats to his life as the primary reason. Rushdie investigated police reports that hitmen had been hired to assassinate him and implied that the police might have exaggerated the potential danger.

Police said that Ruchir Joshi, Jeet Thayil, Hari Kunzru and Amitava Kumar fled Jaipur on the advice of officials at the Jaipur Literature Festival after reading excerpts from The Satanic Verses, which is banned in India. Kunzru later wrote, "Our intention was not to offend anyone's religious sensibilities, but to give a voice to a writer who had been silenced by a death threat".

A proposed video link session between Rushdie and the Jaipur Literature Festival ran into difficulty after the government pressured the festival to stop it.

Rushdie expressed disappointment "on behalf of India", "an India in which religious extremists can prevent free expression of ideas at a literary festival, in which the politicians are too, let's say, in bed with those groups...for narrow electoral reasons, in which the police forces are unable to secure venues against demonstrators even when they know the demonstration is on its way".

The Chairman of the Press Council of India and former judge of the Supreme Court Markandey Katju said that although he was "not in favour of religious obscurantism", he found Rushdie a "poor" and "substandard writer" and the focus on him detracting from more fundamental issues of "colonial inferiority complex" among educated Indians and what a literary mission could be about. Scottish novelist Allan Massie wrote, "The response to words should be words and words in the form of argument, not abuse". Peter Florence, Director, Hay Festivals, said the whole affair showed the importance of book festivals.

On 28 January, Rushdie responded to Chetan Bhagat via Twitter after the popular writer taunted him and his work.

2015
The 2015 festival was scheduled from 21 to 25 January. Earlier that year it had been reported that the tentative list of speakers this season would number 181, including V. S. Naipaul, Chetan Bhagat and Amish Tripathi. The festival also expanded beyond the four walls of Diggi Palace, holding more than 300 events in 10 venues, including the Music Stage at Clarks Amer, the Jaipur BookMark at Narain Niwas, and two special sessions at Amer Fort and Hawa Mahal to focus on heritage and culture, supported by Rajasthan Tourism. Notable sessions of the festival in 2015 included two packed sessions each for Nobel Laureate Sir V. S. Naipaul and former President of India, Dr APJ Abdul Kalam, who drew a 5,000-strong crowd to the Front Lawns of Diggi Palace.

2016
The Jaipur Lit Fest 2016 began at the Diggi Palace as scheduled, with Gair dance from Barmer, Rajasthan accompanied by a crowd that had been waiting since early morning. The Chief Minister, Vasundhara Raje, inaugurated the festival by lighting the ceremonial lamp, and reminisced about her childhood memories of reading books. In this year, the Jaipur Literature Festival entered into the Limca Book of Records.

2017 
Notable speakers at the Jaipur Literature Festival 2017 included writers Shashi Tharoor and Nassim Nicholas Taleb.

2018
The 2018 Jaipur Literature Festival was organised from 25 to 29 January at the Diggi Palace in Jaipur. The biggest yet, the event saw participation from more than 380 people from across the world, who represented over 20 international and 15 Indian languages. The participants included authors, novelists, essayists, actors, politicians, musicians, lyricists, film directors, historians, scientists, broadcasters, businesspersons, poets, translators, marketers, journalists, publishers, playwrights, critics, academics, civil servants, dancers, therapists and activists. Among the prominent speakers at the 2018 edition were Helen Fielding, Hamid Karzai, Shashi Tharoor, Anurag Kashyap, Chetan Bhagat, Chitra Mudgal, Kota Neelima, Nayantara Sahgal, Prasoon Joshi, Rajdeep Sardesai, Roly Keating, Tom Stoppard, Sagarika Ghose, Sharmila Tagore, Sheila Dikshit, Shobha De, Soha Ali Khan, Vinod Dua, Vir Sanghvi and Vishal Bhardwaj. Apart from lectures, book discussions, debates, book readings and book launches, the 2018 Jaipur Literature Festival also featured a music stage, headlined by Kailash Kher, and a theatrical dance performance at Hawa Mahal.

2019 
The Jaipur literature festival 2019 was organised in royal Diggi palace Jaipur from 24 to 28 January 2019. Around 300 speakers were expected to visit Jaipur literature festival 2018–2019, including prominent writers such as Shobha de (known for her bold writing style), Anuradha Roy (Indian novelist, journalist), Chitra Banerjee (best known for her novel The palace of illusions). Some of the speakers including Manisha Koirala (Indian actress), Mithali raj (Indian women cricket team captain) would be the attraction of the festival who would talk about the journey and the challenges of their life. Here are few more names of Jaipur literature festival 2018–2019 are:

 Jon Lee Anderson (American biographer, author  investigative reporter)
 Juergen Boos (CEO of the Frankfurt Book Fair)
 Marc Quinn(British visual artist)
 Markus Zusak (international bestselling author of The Book Thief)
 Molly Crabapple
 N. S. Madhavan (Malayalam fiction-writer and columnist)
 Narendra Kohli (dramatist and comedian)
 NoViolet Bulawayo
 Perumal Murugan (Tamil author and literary speaker)
 Priyamvada Natarajan (astronomer and professor at Yale)
 Andre Aciman (author, memoirist, professor, known for the novel Call Me By Your Name)

2020 
The Jaipur Literature Festival 2020 took place at the royal Diggi Palace from 23 to 27 January 2020. Around 300 speakers attended the Festival.

2021 
The Jaipur Literature Festival 2021 took place Virtual edition from 19 to 28 February 2021. Around 200 speakers are scheduled to attend the Festival.

2022 
The 2022 edition of the festival will take place between January 28 to February 1. The Festival will host over 250 speakers, writers, thinkers, politicians, journalists and popular cultural icons representing 21 Indian and international languages as well as major awards such as the Nobel, the Booker Prize, the Pulitzer Prize and the Sahitya Akademi Award.

 For the first time, Diggi Palace will not be its primary venue.
 For the first time, the festival will not be completely free.
 Notable speakers include Nobel Prize winner, Abdurazak Gurnah, Booker Prize winner, Damon Galgut, Indian writers Vikram Sampath, Shashi Tharoor, Saket Suman and Gurmehar Kaur.

JLF International 
Over the years, related events have also taken place at various times in: Boulder, Colorado; Houston, Texas; Adelaide, Australia; the British Library in London (annually 2014–2019); and New York City.

The November 2018 event in Adelaide was the first of an annual recurrence, known as JLF Adelaide and presented as part of the OzAsia Festival.

References

External links

Further reading 
JLF 2020 - Jaipur Literature Festival (Rajasthan Event, 2020) 
 In Jaipur, the Indian Book Market Comes Into Its Own, 2010 TIME
 Jaipur Literature Festival: Bigger, yes, but better? (DNA India) 

 Everything you need to know about Jaipur Literature Festival 2018 – 2019 (Jaipur fever)

Culture of Jaipur
Literary festivals in India
Festivals established in 2006
2006 establishments in Rajasthan